Undiscovered is a 2005 film starring Steven Strait, Ashlee Simpson and Carrie Fisher. 

Undiscovered may also refer to:
Undiscovered (Brooke Hogan album), 2006
Undiscovered (James Morrison album), 2006
"Undiscovered" (song), the title song
"Undiscovered", a song by Ashlee Simpson from Autobiography, 2004
"The Undiscovered", a 1997 short story by William Sanders
Undiscovered (podcast) a show produced by Science Friday and WNYC Studios